Omar M. Yaghi (born February 9, 1965) is the James and Neeltje Tretter Chair Professor of Chemistry at the University of California, Berkeley, the Founding Director of the Berkeley Global Science Institute, and an elected member of the US National Academy of Sciences.

Early life and education 

Yaghi was born in Amman, Jordan in 1965 to a refugee family, originally from Mandatory Palestine. He grew up in a household with many children, but only had limited access to clean water and without electricity. 
At the age of 15, he moved to the United States at the encouragement of his father.  Although he knew little English, he began classes at Hudson Valley Community College, and later transferred to the University at Albany, SUNY to finish his college degree.  He began his graduate studies at University of Illinois, Urbana-Champaign and received his PhD in 1990 under the guidance of Walter G. Klemperer. He was a National Science Foundation Postdoctoral Fellow at Harvard University (1990–1992) with Professor Richard H. Holm. In 2021, Yaghi was granted Saudi citizenship.

Career 
He was on the faculties of Arizona State University (1992–1998) as an assistant professor, the University of Michigan (1999–2006) as the Robert W. Parry Professor of Chemistry, and the University of California, Los Angeles (2007–2012) as the Christopher S. Foote Professor of Chemistry as well as holding the Irving and Jean Stone Chair in Physical Sciences.

In 2012, he moved to the University of California, Berkeley where he is now the James and Neeltje Tretter Professor of Chemistry. He was the director of the Molecular Foundry at Lawrence Berkeley National Laboratory from 2012 through 2013. He is the Founding Director of the Berkeley Global Science Institute. He is also a co-director of the Kavli Energy NanoSciences Institute of the University of California, Berkeley and the Lawrence Berkeley National Laboratory, as well as the California Research Alliance by BASF.

Professional work 
Yaghi pioneered reticular chemistry, a new field of chemistry concerned with stitching molecular building blocks together by strong bonds to make open frameworks. His most recognizable work is in the design and production of new classes of compounds known as metal-organic frameworks (MOFs), zeolitic imidazolate frameworks (ZIFs), and covalent organic frameworks (COFs). MOFs are noted for their extremely high surface areas ( for MOF-177) and very low crystalline densities ( for COF-108). Yaghi also pioneered molecular weaving, and synthesized the world’s first material woven at the atomic and molecular levels (COF-505).

He has been leading the effort in applying these materials in clean energy technologies including hydrogen and methane storage, carbon dioxide capture and storage, as well as harvesting water from desert air.

According to a Thomson Reuters analysis, Yaghi was the second most cited chemist in the world from 2000–2010.

Honors and awards 
His accomplishments in the design and synthesis of new materials have been honored by the Solid State Chemistry Award of the American Chemical Society and Exxon Co. (1998),  and the Sacconi Medal of the Italian Chemical Society (2004). His work on hydrogen storage was recognized by the US Department of Energy Hydrogen Program Award (2007). He received the Materials Research Society Medal for work in the theory, design, synthesis and applications of metal-organic frameworks and received the Newcomb Cleveland Prize of the American Association for the Advancement of Science for the best paper published in Science (2007). 
Yaghi is the recipient of the American Chemical Society Chemistry of Materials Award  (2009), Izatt-Christensen International Award (2009), the Royal Society of Chemistry Centenary Prize (2010), as well as China Nano Award (2013).  In 2015 he was awarded both the King Faisal International Prize in Chemistry and the Mustafa Prize in Nanoscience and Nanotechnology. In 2016 he was awarded TÜBA Academy Prize in Basic and Engineering Sciences for establishing Reticular Chemistry. In 2017, Yaghi was awarded the Spiers Memorial Award from the Royal Society of Chemistry, the Medal of Excellence of the First Order bestowed by King Abdullah II, the Japan Society of Coordination Chemistry International Award, the Bailar Medal in Inorganic Chemistry, the Kuwait Prize in Fundamental Sciences, and the Albert Einstein World Award of Science conferred by the World Cultural Council. In 2018, Yaghi was awarded the BBVA Foundation Frontiers of Knowledge Award in Basic Sciences for pioneering Reticular Chemistry, and also in 2018 he received the Wolf Prize in Chemistry in which he was cited for pioneering reticular chemistry via metal-organic frameworks and covalent organic frameworks. His work on water harvesting from desert air using metal-organic frameworks was showcased by the World Economic Forum in Switzerland as one of the top 10 emerging technologies, and was awarded the 2018 Prince Sultan bin Abdulaziz International Prize for Water. Yaghi also received the 2018 Eni Award in recognition of his work in applying framework chemistry to clean energy solutions including methane storage, carbon dioxide capture and conversion, and water harvesting from desert air. He was honored with the 2019 Gregori Aminoff Prize by the Royal Swedish Academy of Sciences for the development of reticular chemistry. In 2019, he also received the MBR Medal for Scientific Excellence of the United Arab Emirates, as well as the Nano Research Award. Yaghi was awarded the 2020 August-Wilhelm-von-Hofmann-Denkmünze gold medal of the German Chemical Society for his contribution to reticular chemistry and for pioneering MOFs, COFs, and molecular weaving. Yaghi also received the 2020 Royal Society of Chemistry Sustainable Water Award for his impactful development of water harvesting from desert air using metal–organic frameworks. In 2021, Yaghi was honored with Belgium’s International Solvay Chair in Chemistry, as well as the Ertl Lecture Award by the Fritz Haber Institute of the Max Planck Society and Berlin universities.
On January 20, 2022, during an international award ceremony in Vietnam it was announced that Yaghi won the inaugural VinFuture Prize for Outstanding Achievements in Emerging Fields in recognition of his pioneering Reticular Chemistry.

References

External links 

 The Yaghi Group website.
 Yaghi CV
Omar M. Yaghi – Google Scholar Citations.
MOFs are the most beautiful compounds ever made
 Omar M. Yaghi Lecture – Reticular Chemistry
 Omar M. Yaghi Lecture – Harvesting water from desert air

1965 births
Living people
Albert Einstein World Award of Science Laureates
Jordanian people of Palestinian descent
American people of Palestinian descent
Inorganic chemists
Jordanian chemists
21st-century American chemists
People from Amman
UC Berkeley College of Chemistry faculty
University of Illinois Urbana-Champaign alumni
University at Albany, SUNY alumni
Arizona State University faculty
University of Michigan faculty
Wolf Prize in Chemistry laureates
Jordanian emigrants to the United States
Solid state chemists